Arthur W. "Bugs" Raymond was an American football coach and player. He served as the head football coach at Ohio Northern University from 1914 to 1915, compiling a record of 8–9–1. Raymond played for the Canton Bulldogs (1915) and Youngstown Patricians (1916) of the Ohio League.

Head coaching record

References

Year of birth missing
American football guards
Year of death missing
American football tackles
Canton Bulldogs players
Ohio Northern Polar Bears football coaches
Ohio State Buckeyes football players
Youngstown Patricians players